Nikola Ziković or Nikola Šišmanović (Serbian: Никола Зиковић; 1781 – 1837) was a Serbian revolutionary hero who participant in the First Serbian Uprising and Second Serbian Uprising.

He was born in a trading family in Gornji Matejevac near Niš, where his parents settled after coming from Vidin. As a boy, Nikola learned the craft of weaving, and after the death of his father, he opened his own shop. As early as 1804, as soon as he heard about the Slaughter of the Knezes (Seča knezova) Nikola joined the First Serbian Uprising and led the insurgents from his native village. Soon he would distinguish himself in battles.
In the battle on Kamenica, Nikola was in a trench on Čegar with the Duke of Resava nahija, Stevan Sinđelić.

He fought the Turks until 1813 until the insurrection failed, and when the Second Serbian Uprising under Prince Miloš Obrenović began two years later, in 1815, Nikola immediately joined the insurgents. After Prince Miloš reorganized the principality at the end of 1821 and appointed Joksim Milosavljević as the great serdar of the Danube region, Nikola returned to a peaceful life in Gornji Matejevac where he died in 1837. His sons: Miloš was a member of the detachment of Hajduk Veljko of the Krajina nahija; and Stojko was a participant in Miloje Đak's rebellion and Srndaković-Srndak's Niš rebellion.

Literature
 Adolphe Blanqui, Voyage en Bulgarie 1841, (1843).
 Milan Milićević, Pomenik znamenitih ljudi u srpskog naroda novijeg doba, Beograd, Srpska kraljevska štamparija, Knjiga Čupićeve zadužbine (1888).
 Petar Nikov, Vidin Champions Shishmanoglu, Sofia, Izvestiya na istorichetogo druzhestvo v Sofiya, kn. XIII (1933).

Sources
 Matija Nenadović, Memoari Prote Matije Nenadovića (Belgrade, 1867)
 Milan Đ. Milićević, Pomenik znamenitih ljudi u srpskog narodu novijega doba, Vols. 1 & 2 (Belgrade, 1888)
 Milan Đ. Milićević,Kneževina Srbija (Belgrade, 1878)

References 

1781 births
1897 deaths
Serbian revolutionaries
People from Niš
Serbian soldiers
19th-century Serbian nobility
First Serbian Uprising
Second Serbian Uprising

1837 deaths